Frozen Corpse Stuffed with Dope is the second full-length album released by grindcore band Agoraphobic Nosebleed.

Track listing

Personnel
Scott Hull – guitar, programming, backing vocals
Richard Johnson – bass guitar, backing vocals
Carl Schultz – vocals
J. Randall – vocals, samples
Killjoy – vocals ("Machine Gun")
Pete Benümb – vocals ("Repercussions in the Life of an Opportunistic, Pseudo-Intellectual Jackass")
Lenzig Carnage – vocals ("Razorblades Under the Dashboard")
Dan Lilker – vocals, bass ("Hang the Pope")
J. R. Hayes – vocals ("Hungry Homeless Handjob", "Ceramic God Product", "Organ Donor")
Aaron Turner – album artwork

References

2002 albums
Agoraphobic Nosebleed albums
Albums with cover art by Aaron Turner
Relapse Records albums